Vincent Bernard Murphy (January 4, 1888 in Rochester, Monroe County, New York – February 25, 1956 in Washington, D.C.) was an American politician from New York.

Life
He was the son of Daniel B. Murphy. He served in the U.S. Army during World War I.

He was a member of the New York State Assembly (Monroe Co., 3rd D.) in 1922, 1923 and 1924. He was New York State Comptroller from 1925 to 1926, elected on the Republican ticket at the New York state election, 1924, but defeated for re-election at the New York state election, 1926.

He was a delegate to the New York convention to ratify the 21st Amendment in 1933. He was a Knight of Columbus.

He was buried at the Arlington National Cemetery in Arlington, Virginia.

His son Vincent Bernard Murphy, Jr. (1928–2006), was President of the United States Equestrian Team from 1983 to 1989.

See also
List of Knights of Columbus

References
 Political Graveyard
 Obit in NYT on February 27, 1956 (subscription required)
 His son's obit

1888 births
1956 deaths
New York State Comptrollers
Politicians from Rochester, New York
Burials at Arlington National Cemetery
Republican Party members of the New York State Assembly
20th-century American politicians